Traditional Māori poetry was always sung or chanted, musical rhythms rather than linguistic devices served to distinguish it from prose. There is a large store of traditional chants and songs. Rhyme or assonance were not devices used by the  Māori; only when a given text is sung or chanted will the metre become apparent. The lines are indicated by features of the music. The language of poetry tends to differ stylistically from prose. Typical features of poetic diction are the use of synonyms or contrastive opposites, and the repetition of key words. As with poetry in other languages: "Archaic words are common, including many which have lost any specific meaning and acquired a religious mystique. Abbreviated, sometimes cryptic utterances and the use of certain grammatical constructions not found in prose are also common" (Biggs 1966:447–448).

Modern Māori poets

 Arapera Blank
 Rangi Faith
 Rowley Habib
 Hirini Melbourne
 Jacquie Sturm
 Robert Sullivan
 Hone Tūwhare
Tayi Tibble

References

Bibliography
B.G. Biggs, 'Maori Myths and Traditions' in A. H. McLintock (editor), Encyclopaedia of New Zealand, 3 Volumes. (Government Printer: Wellington), 1966, II:447–454.

Poetry, Maori
New Zealand poetry
Poetry by language
Māori language